Tim Royes (December 25, 1964 – August 13, 2007, New York City) was a British music video director and editor, producing videos for artists such as Westlife ("Mandy"), Melanie C ("I Want Candy", "The Moment You Believe", "Carolyna"), Emma Bunton ("Free Me"), the Sugababes ("Easy" and "Red Dress"), Rachel Stevens ("Sweet Dreams My LA Ex"), and Enya ("Amarantine"). He died at the age of 42 after being struck by a vehicle in Manhattan in the early hours of the morning.

Videos
Many of Royes' videos centered on adult content, with some creating a sizable media stir, the central one being Holly Valance's video "Kiss Kiss", where she appeared in a flesh-coloured body suit to appear naked. Something similar happened in 2007, when Melanie C's music video of the '80s hit "I Want Candy" showed the singer in a skin-tight cat suit and featured a sexually suggestive dance routine with half-naked bodybuilders in crowd-controller uniforms. The video instantly grabbed the number one spot on YouTube with 200,000 hits on its first day.

Sugababes dedicated their 2007 music video "About You Now", directed by Marcus Adams, to Royes' memory, with a black screen saying, "In Memory of Tim Royes – 25.12.1964–13.08.2007 RIP" at the end of the video.

As a tribute to Royes, Melanie C filmed her new video for the title track for her album This Time in September 2007 Adrian Moat, who was a good friend of Royes.

Videography
 Eternal – "So Good" (1994)
 Eternal – "Oh Baby I..." (1994)
 Louise – "In Walked Love" (1996)
 Faith No More – "Ashes to Ashes" (1997)
 Elton John – "Something About the Way You Look Tonight" (1997)
 B*Witched – "Jump Down" (2000)
 Five featuring Queen – "We Will Rock You" (2000)
 Girl Thing – "Girls on Top" (2000)
 Alsou – "Before You Love Me" (2001)
 Louise – "Stuck in the Middle with You" (2001)
 Honeyz - "Talk To The Hand" (2001)
 Holly Valance – "Kiss Kiss" (2002)
 Romeo - "Romeo Dunn" (2002)
 Will Young & Gareth Gates – "The Long and Winding Road" (2002)
 Holly Valance – "Down Boy" (2002)
 Will Young – "You and I" (2002)
 Emma Bunton – "Free Me (2003)
 Appleton – "Don't Worry" (2003)
 Lisa Maffia - "In Love" (2003)
 Rachel Stevens – "Sweet Dreams My LA Ex" (2003)
 Skin – "Faithfulness" (2003)
 Westlife - "Mandy" (2003)
 Beverley Knight – "Not Too Late for Love" (2004)
 Green Day – "Boulevard of Broken Dreams" (2004) (editor, won MTV Video Music Award for Best Editing)
 Enya – "Amarantine" (2005)
 Enya – "It's in the Rain" (2005)
 Texas – "Getaway" (2005)
 Sugababes – "Red Dress" (2006)
 Lee Ryan – "When I Think of You" (2006)
 Bananarama – "Look on the Floor (Hypnotic Tango)" (2006)
 Sugababes – "Easy" (2006)
 Melanie C – "The Moment You Believe" (2007)
 Melanie C – "I Want Candy" (2007)
 Melanie C – "Carolyna" (2007)

External links
Obituary
The Music Video Database
2005 MTV Video Music Award website

1964 births
2007 deaths
British music video directors
Pedestrian road incident deaths
Road incident deaths in New York City